Sicyopterus stiphodonoides is a species of goby that is foundin the Solomon Islands and in the Papua Province in Indonesia.  This species can reach a length of  SL.

References

calliochromus
Freshwater fish of Indonesia
Taxa named by Philippe Keith
Taxa named by Gerald R. Allen
Taxa named by Clara Lord
Fish described in 2012